Coed Talon railway station was a station in Coed Talon, Flintshire, Wales. The station was opened on 1 January 1892, closed to passengers on 27 March 1950 and closed completely on 22 July 1963.

References

Further reading

Disused railway stations in Flintshire
Railway stations in Great Britain opened in 1892
Railway stations in Great Britain closed in 1950
Former Great Western Railway stations
Former London and North Western Railway stations